Escape to Glory is a 1940 American war film directed by John Brahm. It stars Pat O'Brien and Constance Bennett. During World War II, a British freighter carrying a diverse group of passengers is attacked by a German U-boat.

Cast
Pat O'Brien as Mike Farrough
Constance Bennett as Christine Blaine
John Halliday as John Morgan
Alan Baxter as Larry Perrin, alias Larry Ross
Erwin Kalser as Dr. Adolph Behrens
Edgar Buchanan as Charles Atterbee
Frank Sully as Tommy Malone
Marjorie Gateson as Mrs. Winslow
Francis Pierlot as Professor Mudge
Jessie Busley as Mrs. Mudge
Melville Cooper as Ship's Mate Penney
Stanley Logan as Captain James P. Hollister

References

External links
 

1940 films
American war films
1940 war films
Columbia Pictures films
Films directed by John Brahm
World War II films made in wartime
Films set in England
Seafaring films
Films produced by Samuel Bischoff
American black-and-white films
1940s English-language films